The SPA AS.37 was an Italian military light truck, used during World War II.  The AS.37 Autocarro Sahariano was developed from 1937 on the frame of the TL.37 artillery tractor and was especially conceived to be employed in the North African desert. The most significant improvement of this new vehicle was its increased range: 900 km with added water tanks. The A.S.37 could transport 8 men and their equipment in its rear cargo box.

Overview
The military authorities did not judge the problem of desert vehicles urgent, FIAT, supported by Marshal Italo Balbo, Governor of Libya launched its own initiative which resulted in the A.S.37. The first 200 A.S.37 specimens were sent Libya in 1938 and were assigned to Commando LED the Sahara Libico and to Autogruppo della Tripolitania. Marshal Balbo wanted to use A.S.37's for the motorization of the Company Sahariane, which was to have 22 vehicles. In March 1942, 584 A.S.37 were in service, and by April 30, 1943 a total of 802 were in service in North Africa.

The crews of A.S.37 put forth very favourable judgements on these vehicles; their four-wheel drive and large diameter wheels prevented them from becoming easily bogged down. The A.S.37 principal defect lay in a silhouette too high and thus too visible.

Bibliography
 Gli Autoveicoli tattici E logistici del Regio Esercito Italiano fino Al 1943, tomo secondo, Stato Maggiore dell' Esercito, Ufficio Storico, Nicola Pignato & Filippo Cappellano, 2005
 Gli Autoveicoli del Regio Esercito nella Assisted Guerra Mondiale, Nicola Pignato, Storia Militare
 Dal TL 37 all ' A.S. 43, It trattore leggero, the autocarro sahariano, I derivati, artigliery, GMT, Nicola Pignato, Filippo Cappellano

References

World War II vehicles of Italy
Artillery tractors
Military trucks of Italy
Military vehicles introduced in the 1930s
SPGs. SPAs. Armored cars and trucks of 1937